Ciissinraq River is a stream in the Yukon Delta National Wildlife Refuge, in the Bethel Census Area, Alaska, United States.

See also
 List of rivers of Alaska

External links

Rivers of Alaska
Rivers of Bethel Census Area, Alaska
Rivers of Unorganized Borough, Alaska